Moira C. Dunn (born August 3, 1971) is an American professional golfer who plays on the LPGA Tour.

Dunn has won once on the LPGA Tour in 2004.

Amateur wins (5)
1989 New York State Junior Girls
1992 New York State Women's Amateur, Women's Western Amateur
1993 New York State Women's Amateur
1994 New York State Women's Amateur

Professional wins (1)

LPGA Tour wins (1)

References

External links

American female golfers
FIU Panthers women's golfers
LPGA Tour golfers
Golfers from New York (state)
Golfers from Tampa, Florida
Sportspeople from Utica, New York
1971 births
Living people